Çarkçı is a Turkish surname. It is derived from the Turkish noun of Persian origin çark (cf. ) with the meaning "wheel" by adding the Turkish agentive suffix -çı and thus literally means "wheeler", but is translated more appropriately – depending on context – as either machinist or grinder (from the use of a rotating grindstone). Notable people with the surname include:

 Jaklin Çarkçı (born 1958), Turkish mezzo-soprano of Armenian descent
 Nurcan Çarkçı (born 1994)  Turkish female boxer

References

Turkish-language surnames
Occupational surnames